Megadeth is an American thrash metal band formed in Los Angeles in 1983 by vocalist/guitarist Dave Mustaine. Known for their technically complex guitar work and musicianship, Megadeth is one of the "big four" of American thrash metal along with Metallica, Anthrax, and Slayer, responsible for the genre's development and popularization. Their music features complex arrangements and fast rhythm sections, dual lead guitars, and lyrical themes of war, politics, religion, death, and personal relationships.

In 1985, Megadeth released their debut album, Killing Is My Business... and Business Is Good!, on the independent record label Combat Records, to moderate success. It caught the attention of bigger labels, which led to Megadeth signing with Capitol Records. Their first major-label album, Peace Sells... but Who's Buying?, was released in 1986 and was a major hit with the underground metal scene. Band members' substance abuse issues and personal disputes had brought Megadeth negative publicity during the late 1980s. Nonetheless, the band went on to release a number of platinum-selling albums, including So Far, So Good... So What! (1988), Rust in Peace (1990), and Countdown to Extinction (1992). These albums, along with worldwide tours, brought them public recognition.

Megadeth has undergone multiple lineup changes throughout its -year career, with Mustaine being the sole consistent member of the band. The band temporarily disbanded in 2002 when Mustaine suffered an arm injury and re-established in 2004 without longtime bassist David Ellefson, who had taken legal action against Mustaine. Ellefson settled out of court and rejoined the band in 2010, but was fired in 2021 amid allegations of sexual misconduct. Megadeth's current lineup includes Mustaine, bassist James LoMenzo, guitarist Kiko Loureiro and drummer Dirk Verbeuren.

Megadeth earned platinum certifications in the United States for five of its sixteen studio albums, and has received twelve Grammy nominations. Megadeth won its first Grammy Award in 2017 for the song "Dystopia" in the Best Metal Performance category. The band's mascot, Vic Rattlehead, regularly appears on album artwork and live shows. Megadeth has hosted its own music festival, Gigantour, several times since July 2005, and held its first MegaCruise in October 2019.

History

1983–1985: Formation and Killing Is My Business

On April 11, 1983, Dave Mustaine was fired from Metallica just prior to the band recording their debut album Kill 'Em All due to substance abuse and personal conflicts with James Hetfield and Lars Ulrich. As Metallica's lead guitarist since 1981, Mustaine had composed some of the group's early songs and helped hone the band into a tight live unit. Afterward, Mustaine vowed revenge by forming a band that was faster and heavier than Metallica. On the bus trip back to Los Angeles, Mustaine found a pamphlet by California senator Alan Cranston that read: "The arsenal of megadeath can't be rid no matter what the peace treaties come to." The term "Megadeath" stuck with Mustaine and he wrote a song with the spelling slightly changed to Megadeth, which, according to Mustaine, represented the annihilation of power.

After arriving back in Los Angeles, Mustaine began the search for new bandmates for his band. He formed the band Fallen Angels, and after numerous band members, the band's name was changed to Megadeth. As the founder of the band, he added to the band his new neighbors David Ellefson and Greg Handevidt, who had moved from Minnesota to Los Angeles and played bass and guitar.

While Handevidt would only last a few months, Mustaine and Ellefson formed a tight musical bond. Despite his enthusiasm, Mustaine had trouble finding other members to fill out the lineup. He and Ellefson auditioned about 15 drummers, hoping to find one who understood meter changes in music. After briefly playing with Dijon Carruthers, they selected Lee Rausch. Following six months of trying to find a lead singer, Mustaine decided to perform lead vocals himself. Singers who temporarily joined the band included Billy Bonds and John Cyriis, who would found Agent Steel after his firing from Megadeth.

In 1984, Megadeth recorded a three-song demo tape featuring Mustaine, Ellefson, and Rausch. The demo tape, Last Rites, was released on March 9, 1984. It featured early versions of "Last Rites/Loved to Death", "The Skull Beneath the Skin", and "Mechanix", all of which appeared on the band's debut album. The band was unable to find a compatible second guitarist. Kerry King of Slayer filled in on rhythm guitar for several shows in the San Francisco area in the spring of 1984. Afterwards, King went back to Slayer and Megadeth replaced Rausch with jazz fusion drummer Gar Samuelson; he officially joined Megadeth on October 24, 1984. Samuelson had previously been in the jazz band the New Yorkers with guitarist Chris Poland. After seeing Samuelson perform with Megadeth as a trio, Poland went backstage and suggested an impromptu audition as lead guitarist for the band; he joined Megadeth in December 1984.

After considering several labels, Mustaine signed the band to Combat Records, a New York-based Independent record label that offered Megadeth the highest budget to record and tour. In 1985, Combat Records gave the band $8,000 to record and produce its debut album. After spending $4,000 of the budget on drugs, alcohol, and food, the band fired the original producer and finished the recording themselves.

Despite its low-fidelity sound, Killing Is My Business... and Business Is Good! was relatively successful in underground metal circles and attracted major-label interest. Music writer Joel McIver praised its "blistering technicality" and stated that the album "raised the bar for the whole thrash metal scene, with guitarists forced to perform even more accurately and powerfully". The front cover marked the debut of band mascot Vic Rattlehead, who regularly appeared on subsequent album artwork.

Killing Is My Business... and Business Is Good! features "Mechanix", a song Mustaine wrote during his time with Metallica. Though Mustaine told the band after his dismissal not to use the music he had written, Metallica recorded a different version of the song, "The Four Horsemen", with a slower tempo and a melodic middle section. The album also included a cover of Nancy Sinatra's "These Boots Are Made for Walkin'," at a faster tempo and with altered lyrics. Megadeth's version generated controversy during the 1990s, when its writer, Lee Hazlewood, called Mustaine's changes "vile and offensive". Under threat of legal action, the song was removed from pressings released from 1995 to 2001.

In mid-1985, on a bill with Canadian speed metal band Exciter, Megadeth played its first North American tour: the Killing for a Living Tour. Guitarist Mike Albert replaced Poland, who was battling drug addiction. Although Albert was originally supposed to be a permanent replacement, Poland rejoined Megadeth in October 1985, shortly before the group began recording its second album for Combat.

1986–1987: Peace Sells... but Who's Buying?

According to Mustaine, Megadeth was under pressure to deliver another successful album: "That sophomore offering is the 'be-all or end-all' of any band. You either go to the next level, or it's the beginning of the nadir." Mustaine composed the music for the album, with the other members adding arrangement ideas.

The album was produced on a $25,000 budget from Combat Records. Dissatisfied with its financial limitations, the band left Combat and signed with Capitol Records. Capitol bought the rights to the album, and hired producer Paul Lani to remix the earlier recordings. Released in late 1986, Peace Sells... but Who's Buying? has clearer production and more sophisticated songwriting. Mustaine wanted to write socially conscious lyrics, unlike mainstream heavy metal bands who sang about "hedonistic pleasures". The album was noted for its political commentary and helped Megadeth expand its fanbase. The title track was the album's second single, and was accompanied by a music video that received regular airplay on MTV.

In February 1987, Megadeth was the opening act on Alice Cooper's Constrictor tour, and the following month began its first headlining world tour in the United Kingdom. The 72-week tour was supported by Overkill and Necros, and continued in the United States. During the tour, Mustaine and Ellefson considered firing Samuelson for his drug abuse. According to Mustaine, Samuelson had become too much to handle when intoxicated. Drummer Chuck Behler traveled with Megadeth for the last dates of the tour as the other band members feared Samuelson would not be able to continue. Poland quarreled with Mustaine, and was accused of selling band equipment to buy heroin. As a result, Samuelson and Poland were asked to leave Megadeth in 1987, with Behler becoming the band's full-time drummer.

Poland was initially replaced by Jay Reynolds of Malice, but as the band began working on its next record, Reynolds was replaced by his guitar teacher, Jeff Young, when Megadeth was six weeks into the recording of its third album.

1988–1989: So Far, So Good... So What!
With a major-label budget, the Paul Lani-produced So Far, So Good... So What! took over five months to record. The production was plagued with problems, partially due to Mustaine's struggle with drug addiction. Mustaine later said: "The production of So Far, So Good... So What! was horrible, mostly due to substances and the priorities we had or didn't have at the time." Mustaine clashed with Lani, beginning with Lani's insistence that the drums be recorded separately from the cymbals, an unheard-of process for rock drummers. Mustaine and Lani became estranged during the mixing, and Lani was replaced by Michael Wagener, who remixed the album.

So Far, So Good... So What! was released in January 1988 and was well received by fans and critics. The album featured a cover version of the Sex Pistols' "Anarchy in the U.K."; Mustaine changed the lyrics, later saying that he had simply heard them incorrectly. To support the album, Megadeth embarked on a world tour that lasted for nearly eight months. The band (along with Savatage) opened for Dio on the Dream Evil tour and supported Iron Maiden on their Seventh Son of a Seventh Son tour, both in the United States. They also headlined a North American tour with Warlock and Sanctuary (whose debut album Refuge Denied was produced by Mustaine), and a European trek with Testament, Nuclear Assault, Flotsam and Jetsam and Sanctuary.

In June 1988, Megadeth appeared in Penelope Spheeris' documentary The Decline of Western Civilization Part II: The Metal Years. The documentary chronicled the Los Angeles heavy metal scene of the late 1980s, and Spheeris, who had directed Megadeth in the video for "Wake Up Dead", decided to include them to feature a more serious band in contrast to the glam metal groups. Mustaine remembered the film as a disappointment, as it aligned Megadeth with "a bunch of shit bands".

In August, the band appeared at the Monsters of Rock festival at Castle Donington in the United Kingdom, performing to an audience of more than 100,000. One show featured a guest appearance by Metallica drummer (and Mustaine's former bandmate) Lars Ulrich. The band was added to the Monsters of Rock European tour, but left after the first show due to Ellefson's drug problems, for which he was treated immediately. Megadeth was replaced by Testament.

Shortly after the Monsters of Rock appearance, Mustaine fired Behler and Young and canceled Megadeth's Australian tour. "On the road, things escalated from a small border skirmish into a full-on raging war," Mustaine later recalled. "I think a lot of us were inconsistent because of [drugs]." During the tour, Mustaine noticed problems developing with Behler and brought in drummer Nick Menza as Behler's drum technician. As with Samuelson, Menza was expected to take over if Behler could not continue the tour. Menza replaced Behler in 1989. Young's dismissal resulted from Mustaine's suspicions that he was having an affair with Mustaine's girlfriend, an allegation Young denied.

The band was unable to quickly find a suitable replacement for Young. Although 1989 marked the first time since its inception that Megadeth did not tour nor perform at least one show, they recorded a cover version of Alice Cooper's "No More Mr. Nice Guy" which appeared on the soundtrack to the Wes Craven horror movie Shocker. The video was directed by Penelope Spheeris, who recalled the filming as a "Herculean task" as Mustaine was unable to play guitar because of his drug addiction. During the March 1989 auditions for a new lead guitarist, Mustaine was arrested for driving under the influence and possession of narcotics after crashing into a parked vehicle occupied by an off-duty police officer. Mustaine entered court-ordered drug rehabilitation shortly afterwards, and became drug-free for the first time in ten years.

1990–1991: Rust in Peace
With Mustaine sober, Megadeth continued searching for a new lead guitarist. Guns N' Roses guitarist Slash had been jamming with Mustaine and Ellefson, and although it seemed that he might join Megadeth, he remained with Guns N' Roses. Dimebag Darrell of Pantera was offered the job, but the deal fell through after Mustaine refused his request to recruit his brother, Pantera drummer Vinnie Paul, as he had already hired Menza. The offer was also extended to Criss Oliva who also declined as he did not want to leave Savatage. Jeff Loomis, who would later go on to form progressive metal titans Nevermore, also auditioned though Mustaine deemed him too young to join as Loomis was only 18 at the time.

Marty Friedman filled the guitarist position at the recommendation of Ron Laffitte, a member of Capitol management. Laffitte had heard Dragon's Kiss, a solo recording by Friedman when he was in Cacophony. Mustaine and Ellefson were satisfied with Friedman's style and thought that he understood Megadeth's music. With Friedman in the group, the band completed what fans consider the definitive Megadeth lineup. The revitalized band entered the studio at Rumbo Recorders in March 1990 with co-producer Mike Clink to begin Megadeth's most critically acclaimed album, Rust in Peace. Clink was the first producer to complete a Megadeth album without being fired. Its recording was documented in Rusted Pieces, a home video released in 1991 with six music videos and an interview with the band.

Released in September 1990, Rust in Peace debuted at number 23 in the United States and number eight in the United Kingdom. Mustaine had developed a writing style with a rhythmically complex, progressive edge, and the songs featured longer guitar solos and frequent tempo changes. Described as a genre-defining work by Decibel, the album solidified Megadeth's reputation in the music industry. It features the singles "Holy Wars... The Punishment Due" and "Hangar 18", both of which were accompanied by music videos and became live staples. Rust in Peace received a Grammy nomination in 1991 for Best Metal Performance, and was the group's third platinum album, certified in December 1994.

Early in 1990, Megadeth joined Slayer, Testament, and Suicidal Tendencies for the successful European Clash of the Titans tour, featuring several American thrash metal bands. An American leg began the following year featuring Megadeth, Slayer, and Anthrax, with Alice in Chains as a supporting act. The tour was considered a multi-headliner, as the three main bands alternated time slots. In addition to the Clash of the Titans tour, Megadeth (along with Testament) supported Judas Priest on their Painkiller tour in North America late in 1990 and appeared at the second Rock in Rio festival in January 1991. In July 1991 the song "Go to Hell" was featured in the film Bill & Ted's Bogus Journey and on its soundtrack.

1992–1993: Countdown to Extinction
The music for Megadeth's fifth studio album was written in two different sessions. The first session occurred after the conclusion of the Clash of the Titans tour, while the second session happened in the fall of 1991 following a one-month break. Recording sessions for the album began in January 1992 at Enterprise Studios in Burbank, California. Max Norman was chosen to produce, as the band was pleased with his mixing of Rust in Peace. Megadeth spent nearly four months in the studio with Norman, writing and recording what became the band's most commercially successful album, Countdown to Extinction. The album, whose title was suggested by Menza, features songwriting contributions from each band member. Ellefson explained that the band changed its approach to songwriting for this album, beginning to write more melodic songs.

Released in July 1992, Countdown to Extinction entered the Billboard 200 chart at number two and was certified double platinum in the United States.  It received a nomination for Best Metal Performance at the 1993 Grammy Awards, and its title track won a Genesis Award from the Humane Society in 1993 for raising awareness for animal rights issues. Ellefson later said that he and Friedman were disappointed that Megadeth did not win the Grammy: "It was such a bizarre moment, because it was as if the amount of work it had taken to ramp up to that hopeful night was literally gone in a second."

A world tour in support of the album was launched in late 1992, with Pantera and White Zombie as supporting acts. The tour included a North American leg in early 1993, with Stone Temple Pilots as the opening act. One month into the leg, the remaining shows, including dates in Japan, were canceled when Mustaine returned to substance abuse, ending up in a hospital emergency room. After seven weeks in rehab, Mustaine emerged sober again and the band returned to the studio to record "Angry Again". The song is featured on the soundtrack of the 1993 film Last Action Hero and received a Grammy nomination in 1994.

During mid-1993, Megadeth performed at a number of shows with Metallica in Europe. The first was at Milton Keynes Bowl in England, and included Diamond Head. In July, Megadeth was added as the opening act for Aerosmith's Get a Grip Tour, but was removed from the bill after three shows. Aerosmith said that Megadeth was "dumped" because of Mustaine's erratic behavior, while Capitol Records said it was due to "artistic restrictions". After the canceled US tour, Megadeth returned to the studio to record "99 Ways to Die", which appeared on The Beavis and Butt-Head Experience, a compilation album released in November featuring songs interspersed with commentary by the main characters of the animated series Beavis and Butt-Head. The song was nominated for Best Metal Performance at the 1995 Grammy Awards. During these sessions, Megadeth recorded a cover version of Black Sabbath's "Paranoid", which appeared on the Black Sabbath tribute album Nativity in Black; it was nominated for a Grammy the following year.

1994–1995: Youthanasia
In early 1994, Megadeth reunited with producer Max Norman for the follow-up to Countdown to Extinction. With three band members living in Arizona, initial work began at Phase Four Studios in Phoenix. A few days into pre-production, problems with Phase Four's equipment forced the band to look for another studio. Mustaine insisted on recording in Arizona, but no suitable recording facility could be found. At Norman's request, the band built its own recording studio in Phoenix in a rented warehouse, later called "Fat Planet in Hangar 18". During the studio's construction, much of the pre-production songwriting and arrangements were done at Vintage Recorders in Phoenix. At Norman's suggestion, the tracks on Youthanasia had a slower tempo than previous albums, at about 120 beats per minute. The band abandoned the progressive approach from its previous albums and focused on stronger vocal melodies and more accessible, radio-friendly arrangements. For the first time, Megadeth wrote and arranged the entire album in the studio, including basic tracks recorded live by the entire band. The album's recording was video recorded and released as Evolver: The Making of Youthanasia in 1995.

After eight months of studio work, Youthanasia was released in November 1994. It debuted at number four on the Billboard 200 and charted in several European countries. The album was certified gold in Canada the day it was released, and was certified platinum in the US two months later. Megadeth hired fashion photographer Richard Avedon to enhance the band's image. Avedon had the band members exchange their jeans and T-shirts for a more conscious appearance. To promote Youthanasia, the band played a Halloween show in New York City called "Night of the Living Megadeth", which was broadcast live on MTV. In November, the band performed twice on the Late Show with David Letterman, playing "Train of Consequences" on the first appearance and "A Tout le Monde" on the second.

An eleven-month tour began in South America in November 1994. In 1995, Megadeth played in Europe and North America with several opening acts, including Corrosion of Conformity, Korn and Fear Factory. The tour culminated with an appearance at the Monsters of Rock festival in Brazil, co-headlining with Alice Cooper and Ozzy Osbourne. In January 1995, Megadeth appeared on the soundtrack of the horror movie Demon Knight with the song "Diadems". In July, Megadeth released Hidden Treasures, an extended play featuring songs which originally appeared on movie soundtracks and tribute albums.

1996–1999: Cryptic Writings and Risk

After completing the extensive world tour in support of Youthanasia, Megadeth took time off in most of 1996, making it the second time in their career, following 1989, that the band had not done any live shows in a single year. During this hiatus, Mustaine began work on MD.45, a side project with vocalist Lee Ving of Fear. The duo hired drummer Jimmy DeGrasso, who had played with Alice Cooper on the South American Monsters of Rock tour earlier that year. Marty Friedman built a studio in his new home in Phoenix and completed his fourth solo album, released in April 1996.

In September 1996, Megadeth went to London to work on songs for the next album. The songwriting was closely supervised by new manager Bud Prager, who contributed musical ideas and lyrics; many lyrics and song titles were changed at his request. Regarding Prager's influence, Mustaine later wrote: "I figured maybe this guy [Prager] could help me get that intangible number one record I so badly wanted." The album, recorded in Nashville, was Megadeth's first collaboration with country pop producer Dann Huff, who had met Mustaine in 1990.

Cryptic Writings was released in June 1997. The album peaked at number ten on the Billboard 200, and was eventually certified gold in the United States. Its lead single, "Trust", became Megadeth's highest charting song on the Mainstream Rock Tracks at number five, and was nominated for Best Metal Performance at the 1998 Grammy Awards. Although all four singles from the album entered the top 20 on Billboards Mainstream Rock Tracks chart, press response to the album was mixed. The album featured a diverse set of songs which the Los Angeles Times described as a "rousing balance" between older material and experimental songs. Asked about the album's eclecticism, Mustaine said that Cryptic Writings was divided into thirds. One part was based around faster, more aggressive material, another was "radio-orientated music like Youthanasia", and the final third was more melodic.

After more than a year since the band's last concert, Megadeth returned as a live act in June 1997, beginning a world tour with the Misfits and touring in the United States with Life of Agony and Coal Chamber. In July, the band participated in Ozzfest '98 but, halfway through the tour, Menza reportedly discovered a tumor on his knee and left to undergo surgery. Jimmy DeGrasso, who had collaborated with Mustaine in MD.45, was hired to replace Menza for the remainder of the tour. Though initially meant to be a temporary replacement, DeGrasso joined the band permanently after the tour. Mustaine later said that he dismissed Menza from the band because he believed the drummer had lied about having cancer.

Following the band's mainstream radio success with Cryptic Writings, Megadeth again worked with Dann Huff on its eighth studio album. The band began writing in January 1999, supervised by manager Bud Prager, who was credited with co-writing five of the album's twelve songs. With high expectations following the chart success of "Trust", Prager convinced Mustaine to grant Huff even more control over the album's recording, a decision Mustaine later regretted.

Risk, released in August 1999, was a critical and commercial failure and led to backlash from many longtime fans. Although its two predecessors incorporated rock elements alongside a more traditional heavy metal sound, Risk was virtually devoid of metal. About the band's musical direction, Dave Mustaine said: "We hit the nadir of our career with Risk, and I vowed after that we were going to get back to our roots. It took a little bit of time to do that." Despite this, Risk was certified gold in the United States. The album's lead single, "Crush 'Em", appeared on the soundtrack for Universal Soldier: The Return and was used as an entrance theme for NHL hockey games and professional wrestling events.

On July 14, 1999, former drummer Gar Samuelson died of liver failure at age 41 in Orange City, Florida. Eleven days later, during Megadeth's performance at Woodstock 1999, Mustaine dedicated "Peace Sells" to Samuelson's memory. That month, Megadeth also recorded a cover version of the Black Sabbath's "Never Say Die" for the second Nativity in Black tribute album. The band began a world tour in support of Risk in September, playing with Iron Maiden during the European leg. Three months into the tour, Friedman announced his resignation from Megadeth, citing musical differences. Mustaine later said: "I told [Marty] after Risk that we had to go back to our roots and play metal, and he quit."

2000–2003: The World Needs a Hero, breakup, and hiatus
In January 2000, guitarist Al Pitrelli, formerly of Savatage and the Trans-Siberian Orchestra, became Friedman's replacement. Megadeth returned to the studio in April to work on its ninth studio album. A month into production, the band received an offer to join the Maximum Rock tour with Anthrax and Mötley Crüe. Megadeth put the recording on hold and toured North America during the second quarter of 2000. Early in the tour, Anthrax was removed from the bill, allowing Megadeth to play an extended co-headlining set. The tour, however, had poor ticket sales.

After 15 years with Capitol Records, Megadeth left the label in July 2000. According to Mustaine, the departure was due to ongoing tensions with Capitol management. Capitol returned the band's newest recordings and released a greatest hits album, Capitol Punishment: The Megadeth Years, with two new tracks: "Kill the King" and "Dread and the Fugitive Mind". In November, Megadeth signed with Sanctuary Records. The band returned to the studio in October to finish its next album, The World Needs a Hero, which was near completion when Megadeth joined the Maximum Rock tour six months earlier. Following the negative response to Risk, Mustaine fired Bud Prager and produced the album himself. The songs were written by Mustaine alone, except for "Promises", which had contributions from Pitrelli. Two days before the release of The World Needs a Hero, Megadeth appeared in an episode of VH1's Behind the Music showcasing Mustaine, Ellefson, several past members, and Mustaine's old Metallica bandmates James Hetfield and Lars Ulrich.

The World Needs a Hero was released in May 2001 and debuted at number sixteen on the Billboard 200. It was banned in Malaysia when the national government determined that the album's artwork was "unsuitable for the nation's youth". Consequently, the band canceled its concert of August 2 in Kuala Lumpur. The album marked Megadeth's return to a more aggressive sound after the stylistic variations of its previous two albums, but critics felt it fell short of expectations. Mustaine compared the album to a huge ship at sea, turning and trying to right itself to get back on course. Its lead single, "Moto Psycho", reached number 22 on the Billboard Mainstream Rock chart.

A European tour with AC/DC in support of The World Needs a Hero began in mid-2001, followed by an American tour with Iced Earth and Endo in September. Mustaine allowed fans to choose the setlist in each American city. However, the tour was cut short following the September 11 attacks; all dates were canceled, including a DVD shoot in Argentina. The band instead played two shows in Arizona on November 16 and 17, which were filmed and released as Megadeth's first live release, Rude Awakening. That year, Killing Is My Business... and Business Is Good! was remixed and remastered; the reissue featured modified artwork and several bonus tracks.

In January 2002, Mustaine was hospitalized for the removal of a kidney stone and was administered pain medication that triggered a relapse of his drug addiction. Following his stay, Mustaine checked himself into a treatment center in Texas. While there, Mustaine fell asleep with his left arm over the back of a chair, causing compression of the radial nerve. He was subsequently diagnosed with radial neuropathy, which left him unable to grasp or make a fist with his left hand.

On April 3, Mustaine announced in a press release that he was disbanding Megadeth, as his arm injury rendered him unable to play guitar. For the next four months, he had physical therapy five days a week, and slowly began to "re-teach" his left hand. To fulfill contract obligations to Sanctuary, Megadeth released the compilation album Still Alive... and Well?. The first half of the album contains live tracks recorded at the Web Theatre in Phoenix, and the second half has studio recordings from The World Needs a Hero.

Following nearly a year of recovery, including physical and electroshock therapy, Mustaine began work on what was to have been his first solo album. The new material was recorded with session musicians Vinnie Colaiuta and Jimmie Lee Sloas in October 2003. The project was put on hold when Mustaine agreed to remix and remaster Megadeth's eight-album back catalog on Capitol Records, re-recording portions that were missing or altered without his knowledge in the original mixing.

2004–2005: Reformation and The System Has Failed
In May 2004, Mustaine returned to his solo project. Contractual obligations to the band's European label, EMI, resulted in the recording's release as a Megadeth album. Mustaine reformed the band and contacted the fan-favorite Rust in Peace lineup to re-record backing tracks. While drummer Nick Menza agreed to return, both Marty Friedman and David Ellefson were unable to come to an agreement with Mustaine. Menza was sent home shortly after rehearsals began, a few days before the start of a tour supporting Megadeth's upcoming album. Mustaine said Menza was insufficiently prepared for the physical demands of a US tour, and "it just didn't work out". This was the first album without Ellefson. Chris Poland, who played lead guitar on Megadeth's first two albums, was hired to contribute guitar solos to the new album, working with Mustaine for the first time since the 1980s. Poland opted to serve only as a session musician, wanting to remain focused on his jazz fusion project OHM.

The System Has Failed was released in September 2004. Critics heralded it as a return to form; Revolver gave the album a favorable review, calling it "Megadeth's most vengeful, poignant and musically complex offering since 1992's Countdown to Extinction". The album marked a shift toward the band's earlier sound; journalist Amy Sciarretto of CMJ New Music Report wrote that the album contained "neo-thrash riffing with biting, politically charged lyrics". The System Has Failed debuted at number eighteen on the Billboard 200 and was led by "Die Dead Enough", which reached number 21 on the US Mainstream Rock chart. Mustaine announced that the album would be the band's last and would be followed by a farewell tour, after which he would focus on a solo career.

Megadeth began the Blackmail the Universe world tour in October, enlisting touring bassist James MacDonough of Iced Earth and guitarist Glen Drover of Eidolon and King Diamond. Five days before the first show, Menza was replaced by Shawn Drover, who remained with the band as a regular member. The band toured the US with Exodus and Europe with Diamond Head and Dungeon. In June 2005, Capitol released a greatest-hits compilation, Greatest Hits: Back to the Start, featuring remixed and remastered versions of songs chosen by fans from Megadeth's Capitol albums.

In mid-2005, Mustaine organized an annual thrash metal festival tour, Gigantour. Megadeth headlined the inaugural tour with acts such as Dream Theater, Nevermore, Anthrax, and Fear Factory. Performances at the Montreal and Vancouver shows were filmed and recorded for a live DVD-and-CD set released in the second quarter of 2006. On October 9, following the successes of The System Has Failed and the Blackmail the Universe world tour, Mustaine announced to a sold-out crowd at the Pepsi Music Rock Festival in Argentina that Megadeth would continue to record and tour. The concert, held at Obras Sanitarias stadium in Buenos Aires in front of 25,000 fans, was filmed and released on DVD as That One Night: Live in Buenos Aires in 2007.

2006–2008: United Abominations

In February 2006, bassist James MacDonough left the band over "personal differences". He was replaced by James LoMenzo, who had worked with David Lee Roth, White Lion, and Black Label Society. The new Megadeth lineup made its live debut headlining the Dubai Desert Rock Festival in the United Arab Emirates with Testament. In March, Capitol released a two-disc DVD, Arsenal of Megadeth, which included archive footage, interviews, live shows, and many of the band's music videos. Due to licensing issues, soundtrack and non-Capitol videos were not included. The second Gigantour began during the third quarter of 2006; Megadeth again headlined, this time with Lamb of God, Opeth, Arch Enemy and Overkill. The 2006 tour included three dates in Australia, supported by Soulfly, Arch Enemy, and Caliban.

In May 2006, Megadeth announced that its eleventh studio album, United Abominations, was near completion. Originally scheduled for release in October, Mustaine said that the band was "putting the finishing touches on it" and postponed its release to May of the following year. He commented on the release: "Metal needs a really good old-school record again. I believe I have delivered." United Abominations was the band's first album to feature Glen Drover, Shawn Drover, and James Lomenzo. It also has a newer version of "A Tout le Monde" entitled "À Tout le Monde (Set Me Free)". The 2007 version is a duet with Cristina Scabbia of Lacuna Coil; it was recorded at a slightly faster tempo than the original and contains an extended solo.

Released in May 2007, United Abominations debuted at number eight on the Billboard 200, selling 54,000 copies in the first week. In March, Megadeth began a North American tour opening for the newly reformed Heaven & Hell. The band played with Down for Canadian shows and with Machine Head for the US dates. A European summer festival tour followed. Late in the year, Megadeth returned to the United States to headline its Tour of Duty. In November, the band brought Gigantour to Australia with a lineup including Static-X, DevilDriver and Lacuna Coil.

In January 2008, Glen Drover quit Megadeth, stating that he was tired of the frequent touring and wanted to spend more time with his family. He also cited personal issues with other band members. Drover was replaced by Chris Broderick, formerly of Nevermore and Jag Panzer. Broderick was initially asked by Mustaine's management company at the end of 2007 if he would be interested in auditioning for Megadeth. After an informal meeting at Mustaine's house, Broderick was introduced as the band's new guitarist. Mustaine complimented Broderick's playing skills and called him "the best guitarist Megadeth has ever had". Broderick's former Nevermore bandmate, Van Williams, congratulated Megadeth on "getting one hell of a good player, more importantly they're getting a great guy to hang out with and a true friend".

The new lineup made its live debut at the Helsinki Ice Hall on February 4. The 2008 Gigantour, with 29 North American dates, began shortly afterwards. Mustaine wanted a shorter lineup, allowing each band a chance to perform well. The third tour featured In Flames, Children of Bodom, Job for a Cowboy and High on Fire. Megadeth continued the Tour of Duty in South America and Mexico in May and June. A compilation album, Anthology: Set the World Afire, was released in September 2008.

2009–2010: Endgame

In February 2009, Megadeth and Testament were scheduled on the European "Priest Feast" tour, with Judas Priest as headliners. At this time, Metallica, who had been inducted into the Rock and Roll Hall of Fame, invited Mustaine to attend the ceremony. Mustaine was informed that he would not be inducted to the Hall of Fame because such honors were granted only to those members who received recording credit on a Metallica album. Mustaine congratulated the group respectfully, and honored his commitment to the European tour with Judas Priest. In April, Megadeth and Slayer co-headlined the Canadian Carnage. This was the first time they had performed together in more than 15 years. Machine Head and Suicide Silence opened for the four shows that occurred later in June.

In May, Megadeth finished recording its twelfth album, Endgame. The release date for Endgame was announced on the Megadeth official website, and Metal Hammer was the first to review the album track-by-track. Megadeth began its Endgame tour in October, and finished it in December. The tour featured a number of supporting acts, including Machine Head, Suicide Silence, and Warbringer. In January 2010, Megadeth was set to embark on the American Carnage tour with Slayer and Testament, but the tour was postponed due to Tom Araya's back surgery. Several weeks later, Megadeth's "Head Crusher" was nominated for Best Metal Performance at the 2010 Grammy Awards, the band's eighth Grammy nomination in 19 years.

In March, Megadeth embarked on the Rust in Peace 20th Anniversary Tour, which took place in North America and had support from Testament and Exodus. During the tour, Megadeth played Rust in Peace in its entirety. Prior to the start of the tour, original bassist Ellefson rejoined Megadeth after eight years. In an interview for Classic Rock, he stated that Shawn Drover contacted him, informing him that bassist LoMenzo was leaving the band, saying "if ever there was a time for you and Dave [Mustaine] to talk, now is it".

Megadeth, along with Metallica, Slayer, and Anthrax, collectively known as the "big four" of thrash metal, agreed to perform on the same bill during mid-2010. These performances were part of the Sonisphere Festival and were held in a number of European countries. One such performance in Sofia, Bulgaria, was filmed and released as a video album entitled The Big Four: Live from Sofia, Bulgaria. These shows continued the following year in the United States. The first took place in Indio, California, and was the only scheduled show in the United States at the time, although a second American production was held at Yankee Stadium in New York City shortly afterwards.

In July 2010, after the European "big four" shows, Megadeth and Slayer commenced the first leg of the American Carnage Tour, where Megadeth played Rust in Peace in its entirety, while Slayer performed its album Seasons in the Abyss, both of which were released in 1990. From these shows onward, Vic Rattlehead started making sustained onstage appearances, to improve the visual facet of Megadeth's live performances. Shortly afterward, the two bands united with Anthrax for the Jägermeister Music Tour in late 2010. During the final show of the tour, Kerry King joined Megadeth on stage at the Gibson Amphitheatre in Hollywood to perform Megadeth's "Rattlehead". It was the first time that King had performed onstage with Megadeth since 1984. Megadeth and Slayer again shared the stage for the European Carnage Tour in March and April 2011. Megadeth also headlined the fourth annual Rockstar Mayhem Festival in July and August the same year.

In September, the band released the DVD album Rust in Peace Live, recorded at the Hollywood Palladium in Los Angeles. Later that month, Megadeth released "Sudden Death" for the video game Guitar Hero: Warriors of Rock. The song was commissioned by the publishers of the Guitar Hero franchise, who wanted the track to feature dark lyrics and multiple guitar solos. It was nominated for Best Metal Performance at the 2011 Grammy ceremony.

2011–2014: Thirteen and Super Collider
Megadeth returned to its own Vic's Garage studio in 2011 to record its thirteenth album, to be produced by Johnny K, because Andy Sneap, the producer of Megadeth's previous two albums, was unavailable. The album was titled Thirteen and featured previously released tracks such as "Sudden Death" and "Never Dead". The album was released in November 2011, and charted at number eleven on the Billboard 200; its lead single "Public Enemy No. 1" received a Grammy nomination for Best Hard Rock/Metal Performance, but did not win. Shortly after the album was released, Dave Mustaine stated that, after a four-year hiatus, there would be a new Gigantour tour in early 2012. The lineup consisted of Motörhead, Volbeat, and Lacuna Coil alongside Megadeth. After the conclusion of Gigantour, Rob Zombie and Megadeth embarked on a nine-date co-headlining US tour in the summer of 2012.

In September 2012, it was announced that Megadeth would re-release Countdown to Extinction in honor of the album's 20th anniversary. To mark the occasion, Megadeth launched a tour in which the band performed the album live in its entirety. One performance, filmed at the Pomona Fox Theater, was released as a live album, Countdown to Extinction: Live, the following year. Another track from Thirteen, "Whose Life (Is It Anyways?)", was nominated for Best Hard Rock/Metal Performance at the 2013 Grammy Awards, but lost to Halestorm's "Love Bites (So Do I)".

In August, Megadeth announced the recording of its fourteenth album with producer Johnny K. At the start of 2013, Megadeth left Roadrunner Records for Mustaine's newly founded label, Tradecraft, distributed through Universal Music Group. The album, Super Collider, was released in June and debuted at number six on the Billboard 200, the band's highest chart position since 1994's Youthanasia. Critical reaction to the album, however, was largely negative. Shortly after the release of Super Collider, Mustaine stated that he had already started thinking about a fifteenth Megadeth album. He said this had been spurred by the death of Slayer guitarist Jeff Hanneman, which gave him a sense of mortality. Mustaine elaborated: "You know, time is short. Nobody knows how long they're gonna live. You see what happened with Jeff Hanneman, so I wanna write as much as I can while I can."

The 2013 edition of Gigantour featured Black Label Society, Hellyeah, Device, and Newsted as opening bands. At the final show, Jason Newsted, Metallica's former bassist, joined Megadeth onstage to perform "Phantom Lord", a song Mustaine had co-written during his stint with Metallica. Early in 2014, Megadeth was slated to play the Soundwave festival in Australia, but pulled out over a disagreement with tour promoter A. J. Maddah concerning the band's sideshows with Newsted. Icon, an eleven-song compilation of Megadeth's Capitol-era material, was released as part of Universal Music's Icon series in February.

The band encountered several setbacks through the second half of 2014. The August concert in Tel Aviv was canceled due to an armed conflict between Israel and Gaza. Megadeth was scheduled to appear on Motörhead's Motörboat cruise in late September, but withdrew because of Mustaine's complications following his cervical spine surgery. In late November, Drover quit the band after ten years, wanting to pursue his own musical interests. This was quickly followed by the departure of Broderick, due to artistic and musical differences. Ellefson denied rumors that Megadeth would disband, and said he and Mustaine would continue working on new music. Mustaine said that one of the reasons for Broderick's and Drover's departure was the frustration caused by Megadeth's fan base demanding a reunion with Friedman and Menza.

2015–2018: Dystopia

Lamb of God drummer Chris Adler and guitarist Kiko Loureiro of Angra were brought in to perform on Megadeth's fifteenth studio album after Mustaine unsuccessfully attempted to reunite the Rust in Peace lineup. In October 2015, Megadeth streamed "Fatal Illusion" off the album Dystopia, which was released in January 2016. In support of Dystopia, Megadeth embarked on a North American tour in February and March with Suicidal Tendencies, Children of Bodom and Havok (though Havok was soon removed from the tour by Megadeth's management following a dispute over a contract). Mustaine announced that Adler, who was performing with both Lamb of God and Megadeth, was no longer in the band due to scheduling conflicts between the two bands. He was replaced by Dirk Verbeuren from Soilwork, on Adler's recommendation. A second US tour took place in September and October, with support from Amon Amarth, Suicidal Tendencies, Metal Church, and Butcher Babies. Former drummer Menza died of a heart attack on May 21, 2016, while performing with OHM at a jazz club in Los Angeles.

Asked about any further Big Four gigs, Mustaine called for "the powers-that-be" to help put together a new Big Four tour in 2017 as all the respective bands were promoting new albums. Dystopias title track won the Grammy Award for Best Metal Performance at the 2017 Grammy Awards, the band's first win after 12 nominations. Mustaine, Loureiro, Ellefson, and Verbeuren attended the ceremony; however, album drummer and award recipient Chris Adler did not. While accepting the award, the house band played Mustaine's former band Metallica's "Master of Puppets" causing some controversy among fans.

In a June 2017 interview with No Brown M&Ms, Mustaine said that Megadeth would enter the studio at the end of the year to begin working on their sixteenth studio album. A month later, Mustaine stated on Twitter that he had begun "collecting ideas" for the new album, but stated that they would "probably" enter the studio in mid-2018 to begin recording it for a 2019 release. The band joined with Scorpions for a co-headlining tour in the fall of 2017.

In 2018, Megadeth marked their 35th anniversary by re-releasing their 1985 debut album Killing Is My Business... And Business Is Good!, dubbed Killing Is My Business... and Business Is Good! - The Final Kill on June 8, 2018, as a deluxe package containing remastered versions of all songs to Mustaine's intended vision, a re-cut version of "These Boots" lyrically adjusted to Lee Hazlewood's version, rare live performances of songs off the album during Alice Cooper's Live in the Flesh Tour and the 1984 three song demo.

2019–present: The Sick, the Dying... and the Dead!
The band was originally scheduled to perform on the first-ever MegaCruise to coincide with the release of the next album, due to sail on October 13, 2019, from Los Angeles and hit ports of San Diego and Ensenada before returning on October 18, including performances by heavy metal acts such as Lamb of God, Anthrax, Testament, Overkill, Corrosion of Conformity, Queensrÿche, Armored Saint, Metal Church, Suicidal Tendencies, DragonForce, Doro, John 5, Death Angel and Toothgrinder, however, Mustaine was not present due to his illness. It was instead a live performance featuring members of each respective band playing Kiss songs.

On May 10, 2019, Megadeth entered the studio in Franklin, Tennessee to begin pre-production of the next album, once again teaming up with Dystopia co-producer Chris Rakestraw. On June 17, the band announced that all shows scheduled in 2019 (with the exception of the MegaCruise) would be cancelled due to Mustaine being diagnosed with throat cancer; of all the cancelled dates, the band was scheduled to support Ozzy Osbourne on the North American leg of the No More Tours II tour, which had been postponed from the summer of 2019 to the summer of 2020 due to Osbourne sustaining an injury while dealing with pneumonia. They were replaced by Marilyn Manson instead. Despite Mustaine's illness, the band vowed to continue working on their new album. On November 6, Mustaine shared a video on Instagram teasing a track from the band's upcoming album, which was originally set for release in 2019. On July 17, Megadeth announced their partnership with Gimme Radio and Richard Childress Racing on the No. 2 Gimme Radio Chevrolet Camaro, which was driven by Xfinity Series driver Tyler Reddick at the New Hampshire 200 on July 20. On August 21, the band announced that they would embark on their first tour since Mustaine's illness in January and February 2020, with Five Finger Death Punch and Bad Wolves supporting on the European tour.

Megadeth was originally scheduled to embark on a co-headlining tour in North America with Lamb of God dubbed "The Metal Tour of the Year" in the summer of 2020, with Trivium and In Flames as support acts, but was postponed due to the COVID-19 pandemic. The tour was rescheduled for the summer of 2021, with Hatebreed replacing In Flames due to the latter being forced to withdraw from the line-up due to international visa issues caused by the pandemic. Megadeth re-entered the studio in Nashville in mid-2020 to resume recording their new album, tentatively planned for release in 2021.

While hosting a Masterclass "Front Row Live" for fans via Zoom on January 9, 2021, Mustaine announced the title of the band's sixteenth album would be called The Sick, the Dying... and the Dead!, however he indicated that the title might be subject to change. In May 2021, sexually explicit videos of Ellefson were leaked to social media, resulting in his dismissal from Megadeth on May 24. Ellefson later confirmed that he had actually been dismissed ten days earlier on May 14; the videos originally surfaced on May 10. Following the controversy, Mustaine stated that there would be no chance for Ellefson to rejoin the band.

On Mustaine's Gimme Radio program The Dave Mustaine Show on June 17, he said that the bass tracks recorded by Ellefson in May 2020 would not appear on the upcoming album and would be re-recorded by a different bassist, which was completed a short time later, but did not say who it was. He also revealed a song title from the album called "The Dogs of Chernobyl". Mustaine confirmed soon after that a new bassist was chosen with a picture showing the neck of the bass guitar and the unknown member being shown on the floor behind a chair, however, he did not reveal the name, but would announce it soon. Former bassist James LoMenzo filled in for the band's tour, while Steve Di Giorgio of Testament performed as a session bassist on The Sick, the Dying... and the Dead!, which was released in September 2022. LoMenzo was announced as the band's official bassist in May 2022.

After several teasers, "We'll Be Back", the first single from the record, was released on June 23, along with the tracklist, followed by next singles "Night Stalkers" and "Soldier On!", released on July 22 and August 12 respectively.

Controversies
Mustaine has made numerous inflammatory statements in the press, usually regarding issues with former Metallica bandmates. The feud stemmed from his ejection from the band, how it was conducted, and disagreements on songwriting credits. Mustaine expressed his anger in the movie Metallica: Some Kind of Monster, in a scene he later disapproved of as he felt he was mischaracterized, and that it did not represent the full extent of what happened during the meeting.

During a live performance of "Anarchy in the U.K." at a 1988 show in Antrim, Northern Ireland, Mustaine dedicated the song to "the cause" of "giving Ireland back to the Irish!" Before the final song, Mustaine said, "This one's for the cause! Give Ireland back to the Irish!" This elicited a riot and fighting between Catholics and Protestants among the audience. The band had to travel in a bulletproof bus back to Dublin. This incident served as inspiration for the song "Holy Wars... The Punishment Due".

Controversial and misinterpreted lyrics have caused complications for the band. In 1988, MTV deemed that the song "In My Darkest Hour" encouraged suicide and banned the video. The station banned the video for "A Tout le Monde" for the same reason, though Mustaine said the song was written from the perspective of a dying man saying his last words to his loved ones. According to him, MTV considered the videos for "Skin o' My Teeth" and "Symphony of Destruction" a "little bit too harsh" and refused to play them.

During a world tour in 2001, the Malaysian government canceled the band's show in the nation's capital because the authorities had a negative perception of the group's image and music. The government deemed the band's mascot, Vic Rattlehead, as inappropriate and told the members that they would be arrested if they performed. Dave Mustaine responded: "I recognize what the Malaysian government is trying to do, and it is admirable of them trying to protect the young people in the country. But it just shows the degree of ignorance and apathy that the government has toward the problem."

In 2003, after recovering from an arm injury that threatened to end his career, Mustaine became a born-again Christian. Minor controversy was sparked by Mustaine's announcement that Megadeth would not play certain songs live due to his conversion. In May 2005, Mustaine allegedly threatened to cancel shows in Greece and Israel with extreme metal bands Rotting Christ and Dissection due to the bands' anti-Christian beliefs. This caused the two bands to cancel appearances.

In July 2004, former bassist Ellefson sued Mustaine for $18.5 million in the United States District Court for the Southern District of New York. Ellefson alleged that Mustaine short-changed him on profits including tour merchandise and publishing royalties. The suit was dismissed in 2005, and Mustaine filed a countersuit alleging that Ellefson had used the band's name in an advertisement for musical equipment; the suit was settled out of court.

On May 10, 2021, sexually explicit videos of Ellefson were posted on Twitter. The videos, reportedly recorded by a fan that Ellefson was in correspondence with, initially led to accusations of child grooming. However, Ellefson and the other party both denied the accusations, and the fan publicly claimed they were a consenting adult and the videos were unknowingly released by a third party. The Scottsdale Police Department (SPD) was contacted by Ellefson, who sought charges for revenge porn. Ellefson took a polygraph test to affirm his claims and presented police with a photo of the fan's driver's license to prove their age. He also shared screen shots of Snapchat and WhatsApp messages related to the allegations. Ellefson's partner admitted that she had shared the video with some friends but wasn't sure how it got leaked out to others. The SPD report states the fan "was remorseful and agreed to send out a social media statement on...Instagram" that they were "a willing consenting adult during their mutual virtual sexual encounter." Ellefson then posted her statement and one of his own on May 10, asserting that the allegations of grooming were false. Ellefson stated he has not been extorted in any way, and he believes the videos of their consensual adult encounter were not intentionally leaked.  An official statement released the next day from Megadeth stated that the situation was being "watched closely". Mustaine announced on May 24, 2021, that Ellefson was fired from the band.

Artistry
Influences and style
Traditional heavy metal bands such as UFO, Black Sabbath, Budgie, new wave of British heavy metal (NWOBHM) bands such as Raven, Judas Priest, Motörhead, Iron Maiden, Diamond Head, and Venom, and punk rock bands such as the Sex Pistols and Ramones had a significant influence on Megadeth's sound. Hard rock bands such as AC/DC, Queen, and Led Zeppelin, as well as German acts like Scorpions and Accept, were also influential on the group's guitar style. Although the music has roots in punk, university professor Jason Bivins wrote that Megadeth followed the basic blueprint of Motörhead and Iron Maiden. He described the style as a mix of "the instrumental virtuosity of the NWOBHM with the speed and aggression of hardcore punk", while also drawing lyrical inspiration from the horror-obsessed punk band Misfits. Mustaine has also listed albums by the Beatles and David Bowie as recordings that influenced him.

Mustaine is the band's primary songwriter. He develops songs starting with a particular riff that, with modifications, becomes the central part of the song. He has said that song fragments are composed separately, and then the band makes a compact structure from them. Drummer Shawn Drover stated that Mustaine had saved many riffs over the years and that some recent material is based on those demo recordings. Ellefson stated that the band constantly creates new material, and that making a recording begins with exchanging ideas after which the band enters the studio and discusses the concept, direction, artwork, and song titles. The lyrics are usually written after the music is arranged. Discussing the band's lyrics, Mustaine said that many of the themes are derived from literature, such as the novels of George Orwell.

The music of Megadeth and its underground metal contemporaries from the 1980s featured harsh vocals, double bass drum patterns, staccato riffing, power chords, tremolo picking, and screeching lead guitar work; albums from this period were produced on low budgets. After forming Megadeth, Mustaine followed the thrash metal style of his previous band, Metallica, with more emphasis on speed and intensity. When asked to describe Megadeth's guitar style, Mustaine answered: "When you go to a show and see a guitar player who just stands there, that's a guitar player. A thrash guitar player is a guy who plays like he wants to beat the guitar's guts out." Most of the songs are recorded in standard guitar tuning as Mustaine believes it to provide a superior melody to alternative methods of tuning.
In 2017, David Ellefson talked in an interview about how the band recently started to use a lower tuning saying: "it's just natural with age, for singers it can be a struggle, so rather than quit, than not play, how do you work it around? Well, let's drop the guitars, let's find a way to work around it."

During the band's early days, Mustaine was the rhythm guitarist, while Chris Poland played lead. Poland performed only on Megadeth's first two albums at the time of the book's release; (he would go on to play on the 2004 album The System Has Failed); music journalists Pete Prown and Harvey P. Newquist credit him with making the music more colorful because of his jazz influences. According to former Metal Maniacs editor Jeff Wagner, the band's songwriting techniques peaked with the fourth album, Rust in Peace, which he described as a "flurry of precision and fluidity, making good on Megadeth's claim to being the world's state-of-the-art speed metal band". Musicologist Glenn Pillsbury stated the guitar work on the album was a mixture of Mustaine's "controlled chaos" and the "technical brilliance" of Marty Friedman. Studio efforts released in the mid- and late 1990s featured songs with compact structures and less complicated riffing.

Megadeth's lyrics often focus on death, war, politics, and religion. The lyricism centers on nihilistic themes, but occasionally deals with topics such as alienation and social problems. The earliest releases featured themes such as occultism, graphic violence, and Satanism. Nuclear warfare and government conspiracy were preoccupations on albums such as Rust in Peace and Countdown to Extinction. During Megadeth's commercial peak, Mustaine elaborated on more personal themes such as addiction and intimate relationships. For the lyrics on Cryptic Writings, Mustaine said that he wanted to write songs that had more appeal to a wider audience. The title of United Abominations is a satiric play on the name of the United Nations; Mustaine criticized the organization's ineffectiveness on a number of songs on that album.

Legacy
Having sold about 38 million units worldwide, Megadeth is one of the few bands from the 1980s American underground metal scene to have achieved mass commercial success. Along with contemporaries Metallica, Slayer, and Anthrax, Megadeth is regarded as one of the core founding groups of thrash metal. These bands are often referred to as the "big four" of thrash metal, responsible for the genre's development and popularization. Loudwire ranked Megadeth the third best thrash metal band of all time, praising the group's "provoking lyrics and mind-warping virtuosity". CMJ New Music Report called the band's debut album a seminal release and a representative of "the golden age of speed metal". Billboard called the band's second album Peace Sells... but Who's Buying? a "landmark of the thrash movement" whose lyrics it found still relevant. MTV also recognized the band as an influential metal act, highlighting the technical aspect of the early albums.

Megadeth is considered one of the most musically influential groups that originated in the 1980s. As part of the early American thrash metal movement, the band's music was a direct influence on death metal. Sociologist Keith Kahn-Harris wrote that the mainstream success of Megadeth was one of the reasons for the expansion of extreme metal to countries where it had previously been unknown. The band's sound and album artwork influenced a number of thrash metal bands in the 21st century, including Toxic Holocaust and Warbringer. According to Nielsen SoundScan, Megadeth has sold 9.2 million copies of its albums in the United States between 1991 and 2014.

Band membersCurrent members'''
 Dave Mustaine – guitars, lead vocals (1983–2002, 2004–present)
 James LoMenzo – bass, backing vocals (2006–2010, 2022–present)
 Kiko Loureiro – guitars, backing vocals (2015–present)
 Dirk Verbeuren – drums (2016–present)

Discography

 Killing Is My Business... and Business Is Good! (1985)
 Peace Sells... but Who's Buying? (1986)
 So Far, So Good... So What! (1988)
 Rust in Peace (1990)
 Countdown to Extinction (1992)
 Youthanasia (1994)
 Cryptic Writings (1997)
 Risk (1999)
 The World Needs a Hero (2001)
 The System Has Failed (2004)
 United Abominations (2007)
 Endgame (2009)
 Thirteen (2011)
 Super Collider (2013)
 Dystopia (2016)
 The Sick, the Dying... and the Dead! (2022)

Accolades

Classic Rock Roll of Honour Awards:
 2014: Metal Guru – Dave Mustaine

Clio Awards:
 2016: Silver Winner – "The Megadeth VR Experience"

Genesis Awards:
 1993: Doris Day Music Award – Countdown to ExtinctionGrammy Awards:
 2017: Best Metal Performance – "Dystopia"

Loudwire Music Awards:
 2011: Metal Album of the Year – Thirteen''
 2011: Metal Song of the Year – "Public Enemy No. 1"

Metal Hammer Golden Gods Awards:
 2007: Riff Lord – Dave Mustaine
 2015: Golden God – Dave Mustaine

Revolver Golden Gods Awards:
 2009: Golden God – Dave Mustaine

Footnotes

References

Bibliography

External links

 
 Megadeth, Arizona – Reconstructed site from circa 2000
 
 
 
 

 
1983 establishments in California
Capitol Records artists
Grammy Award winners
Heavy metal musical groups from California
Musical groups established in 1983
Musical groups disestablished in 2002
Musical groups reestablished in 2004
Musical groups from Los Angeles
Musical quartets
Roadrunner Records artists
American speed metal musical groups
Thrash metal musical groups from California
Universal Records artists